Maia Parish may refer to:
 Maia (Ribeira Grande)
 Maia Parish (Maia) in Maia Municipality

Parish name disambiguation pages